The Mount School is a private Quaker day and boarding school for girls ages 3 –18, located in York, England. The school was founded in 1785 and the current principal is David Griffiths. It is one of seven Quaker schools in England. The Mount offers full boarding, weekly and flexible boarding and in 2020 became the first girl's school in the North of England to become an All Steinway School. The school is also a member of the Girls' Schools Association and the Independent Schools Council. The Mount School has been acknowledged as one of the top private girls' schools in the United Kingdom. In The Times League Table, the school is ranked 2nd by A-level results in the York area. In the Yorkshire Post, the school was ranked top of an A-level results table for Yorkshire in 2012.

History
The school under the name Trinity Lane (or York) Quaker Girls' School was founded in 1785 by Yorkshire Quaker, Esther Tuke, wife of William Tuke.

In 1831 Esther and William's grandson Samuel Tuke along with William Alexander, Thomas Backhouse and Joseph Rowntree moved the school to Castlegate House with Hannah Brady as superintendent (1831–42.  She was followed by Elizabeth Brady (1842–47), Eliza Stringer (1847–1853), and Rachel Tregelles (1853–1862). Lydia Rous returned from helping in the American Civil War to become head. Rous retired in 1879.  In 1856 it moved to its present premises, The Mount. From 1890 to 1902 the Headmistress was Lucy Harrison. From 1946 to 1966 Margery Willoughby was the head teacher.

Traditions

The Mount School has many long-standing traditions throughout the school year, including a game event Games in the Dark at Bonfire Night, where Year 11 students arrange a treasure hunt challenge for the younger students to take part in. College girls present two events to the school, one at the end of each term, respectively, the College I Pantomime and the Leavers' Play at Leaver's Supper, at which the new head girls present the old head girls with flowers and College II present the school with a gift, typically, an award in memory of a teacher and a digital photo frame of student trips.

The school holds an end of term meeting both at Christmas and in the summer.

Between these meetings is Family Day. This event is typically held around mid-May and is the main fundraising event of the year. The school body selects two charities to support: one based in the U.K. and one overseas. The students and staff speak about potential charities and all students vote for which charities to support. Family Day is an opportunity for every year to run a stall to raise money, whilst music and drama group offer entertainment. Other activity groups run stalls to raise awareness for the work of organisations such as Amnesty International and Eco-Schools Eco Committee, which in 2011 won the Green Flag Award for the school. This represents the highest achievement for an eco-friendly school.

The Foundation Meeting (or Speech Day) summarises the year and introduces the new head girl team. Awards and scholarships are presented to students from every year group, including Grade 8 Music and Drama awards. Each leaver in College II writes a few sentences about their time at The Mount and their future plans, these are read out as they receive a necklace of the Mount Rose as a leaving gift.

Other traditions include such events as the Carols on the Stairs, which takes place at Christmas, and Tea Party with the Elderly.

Curriculum 
Academically the school maintains traditional values and has developed ‘pillars of excellence’ in several subject areas: sciences, maths, history, music, sports, art, drama and foreign languages.

Sports

The Mount has many sporting activities for every year group like orienteering and fencing, netball, hockey and swimming in the winter and rounders, tennis and athletics in the summer. College girls are able to choose from a wider variety of sports including lacrosse and using the fitness suite.

The school has a team for hockey, netball, tennis, rounders, swimming athletics and cross country. These teams compete with other schools in the area.

Creative Arts

The Mount is an All Steinway School   and holds annual concerts. Musical opportunities include Senior and Junior Orchestra, Senior and Junior Choir, a Wind group and Swing Band for woodwind and brass instruments.

The Mount follows the London Academy of Music and Dramatic Art (LAMDA) syllabus and there is usually a school and College Play every year. Previous years have performed Alice, The History Boys and Accrington Pals. The Drama department present I See A Voice every year.

Peace Studies
In 2012, the school became the first in England to introduce the PeaceJam Foundation's Ambassadors programme into the school curriculum, as opposed to as an after school club or extra curricular activity.

Notable alumnae 

 Isobel Barnett, Scottish radio and television personality of the 1950s and 1960s
 Virginia Beardshaw CBE, Founder Fellow of the King's Fund Institute 
 Dame Jocelyn Bell Burnell, astrophysicist
 Kate Bellingham BBC technology presenter and engineer
 Laura Busson, BBC Radio 2 Commissioning Executive 
 Dame A. S. Byatt, author
 Ruth Cadbury, politician
 Margaret Crosfield, palaeontologist, one of the first 13 female fellows of the Geological Society of London in 1919.
 Dame Judi Dench, actress
 Dame Margaret Drabble, author
 Audrey Evans, paediatric oncologist, co-founder of Ronald MacDonald House 
 Professor Ruth Finnegan, social anthropologist 
 Mary Sturge Gretton historian and magistrate
 Jean Henderson, lawyer and Liberal Party politician
 Rachel Howard, contemporary artist
 Noni Jabavu, South African writer and journalist 
 Dame Elaine Kellett-Bowman, former Conservative MP
 Rose Neill, BBC Broadcaster
 Nuzo Onoh, British-Nigerian writer 
 Helen Osborne, journalist and critic
 Winifred Sargent, English mathematician 
 Anna Southall, Director of the National Museum Wales
 Nicola Spence, Biologist 
 Cheryl Taylor, controller of CBBC
 Kathleen Mary Tillotson, literary scholar
 Mary Ure, actress
 Elfrida Vipont, children's author
 Hilary Wainwright, feminist and Guardian writer
 Anna Walker, BBC Tomorrow's World and Sky presenter
 Frances Wilson (writer), English author, academic and critic
 Elizabeth Young, journalist and literary critic

See also
 List of Friends Schools

References

Further reading
 Sturge, H. W. & Clark, T. The Mount School. York, 1785 to 1931. (Pub. 1931).
 Smith, M. F. & Waller, E. A. The Mount School. York, 1857 to 1957. (Pub. 1957).
 The Mount OSA. A register of old scholars, 1931-1932. (Pub. 1932).
 The Mount School Annual reports (annual lists of pupils 1919–1940).
 Old York Scholars Association Annual reports, 1887-1901. OSA Annual reports. (Pub. 1890).
 Sheils, S. (2007) Among Friends, The Story of The Mount School, York. London: James & James.

External links
 The Mount School Official Site
 The Mount Junior School Official Site
 Profile on the ISC website
 Profile at MyDaughter
  Mount Old Scholars Association

Boarding schools in North Yorkshire
Quaker schools in England
Girls' schools in North Yorkshire
Private schools in York
Member schools of the Girls' Schools Association
1831 establishments in England